Van Mol is a surname. Notable people with the surname include:

 Charles Van Mol (1895–?), Belgian racing cyclist
 Pieter van Mol (1599–1650), Flemish painter
 Tom Van Mol (born 1972), Belgian footballer

See also
 Van Mil

Surnames of Dutch origin